Kaifeng TV Tower is a free standing telecommunications tower in Kaifeng, China which was completed in 1995. The tower stands  and features a revolving restaurant.

See also
 List of towers
 Lattice tower

References

Buildings and structures in Kaifeng
Towers in China